Far from the Madding Crowd is a 2015 British romantic drama film directed by Thomas Vinterberg and starring Carey Mulligan, Matthias Schoenaerts, Tom Sturridge, Michael Sheen, and Juno Temple. An adaptation by David Nicholls of the 1874 novel Far from the Madding Crowd by Thomas Hardy, it is the fourth film adaptation of the novel.

Plot

The film is set in about 1870 in Britain. While Bathsheba Everdene (Carey Mulligan) is working on her aunt's farm in Dorset, she meets a neighbouring farmer, Gabriel Oak (Matthias Schoenaerts). As they get to know one another, he proposes, but the headstrong Bathsheba declines, saying she is too independent. One night, a new sheepdog chases Gabriel's entire flock off a cliff. After settling his debts, he is penniless, and leaves in search of work. In contrast, Bathsheba inherits a farm from her uncle and leaves to take charge of it.

While at a fair trying to find employment, Gabriel sees recruiting officers. A girl, Fanny Robbin, points out one of the soldiers, Sergeant Frank Troy, her sweetheart. She suggests Gabriel seek employment at a farm in Weatherbury. Gabriel arrives to find several buildings on fire and saves the barn from destruction. At dawn the next day, he is introduced to the farm's new mistress, Bathsheba, who hires him as a shepherd. In the meantime, Fanny goes to the wrong church for her wedding and Troy, apparently jilted, is devastated.

While in town trading her seed, Bathsheba sees her neighbour William Boldwood (Michael Sheen), a prosperous and mature bachelor. Bathsheba sends Boldwood a Valentine as a joke, and he, both offended and intrigued, soon proposes marriage. Bathsheba delays giving him a final answer, and Gabriel admonishes her for toying with Boldwood's affections. She is stung by his criticism, and fires him, but the next day, given a crisis with the sheep that only he can manage, she goes after him and successfully persuades him to return.

One night while out walking, Bathsheba meets Frank Troy, who expresses admiration for her; the next day he returns to help with the harvest. He flirts with Bathsheba and arranges a secret meeting. At their rendezvous in the woods, he shows off his swordplay, telling her not to flinch as he swings his sword around her head and body. He embraces her passionately and Bathsheba is left in a daze. Gabriel warns her against Troy, but she elopes with him. Returning to the farm, the newly married couple celebrate with all the workers and Troy begins to show his bad side. When Gabriel seeks help to protect the hayricks from an approaching storm, Troy, belligerent and drunk, refuses to take him seriously. Gabriel single-handedly tries to cover the harvest with tarpaulins and Bathsheba, ashamed of Frank's drunken behaviour, comes out into the stormy weather to help. Chastened, she tells Gabriel that she was a fool to fall prey to Frank's flattery.

One day in town, Troy sees Fanny begging. She tells him of her error on their wedding day, and reveals that she is pregnant. He sends her to the workhouse while promising to take care of her. When he asks Bathsheba for £20, she refuses, having become annoyed at his gambling. Fanny and her baby die in childbirth; their coffin is delivered to Bathsheba's farm, Fanny's last known address. The words "Fanny Robbin and child" are on the coffin, but Gabriel surreptitiously erases "and child" while bringing it in. Bathsheba recognises Fanny's name, notices the erasure, opens the coffin, and discovers the mother and baby within. When Troy returns, he bends over the coffin and kisses Fanny's lips. When Bathsheba protests, he responds that even in death Fanny means more to him than Bathsheba ever could. In grief he goes to the beach, where he strips off his uniform and swims far into the ocean; everyone believes he has drowned.

Left with Frank's gambling debts, Bathsheba worries she may lose the farm. Boldwood offers to buy it and merge it with his property, offering Gabriel a position as bailiff, and again proposes marriage. Bathsheba agrees to consider his offer. On the eve of the Christmas party he plans to throw, Boldwood tells Gabriel that he is aware of Gabriel's feelings for Bathsheba, and shows Gabriel the engagement ring he plans to offer her. At the party, Boldwood graciously invites Gabriel and Bathsheba to dance together; she again asks Gabriel what she should do, and he answers that she should "Do what is right." Leaving the dance, she discovers Troy, outside, alive and well. Having been rescued from drowning, he has faked his death for some weeks. He demands money from Bathsheba, claiming it was unfair that he gave up his profession and now lives off nothing while she has money and a house. Frank grabs her roughly, screaming that she is still his wife and must obey him. Enraged, Boldwood emerges from the house and kills Frank with a single blast from his double-barrelled shotgun, for which he is promptly imprisoned. Gabriel reassures Bathsheba that if it's any consolation Boldwood is bound to be spared his life, for acting in a 'crime of passion'.

Some time later, Gabriel announces that since the farm is now secure, he'll be emigrating to America in four days' time. As he leaves on foot early in the morning, Bathsheba chases after him on horseback and begs him not to leave, thanking him for all he's done for her, and always believing in her. Gabriel asks her if she would agree were he to propose again. Bathsheba smiles and tells him he needs ask but once more. Gabriel kisses her passionately in response, and they walk back hand in hand.

Cast

Production

David Nicholls became attached to the film in 2008. Matthias Schoenaerts was offered the role of Gabriel Oak alongside Carey Mulligan as Bathsheba Everdene. Their casting was official in May 2013 with the participation of director Thomas Vinterberg.

Principal photography started on 16 September 2013. The film was shot in Dorset (Sherborne, Mapperton, and Beaminster), Oxfordshire, Buckinghamshire and London.

Mulligan claimed, in an appearance on The Graham Norton Show, that she hand-picked Schoenaerts to play Gabriel Oak after she saw him in the French film Rust and Bone.

Thomas Vinterberg invented the scene in which Sergeant Troy clutches Bathsheba's crotch after the sword tricks because he wanted it to get more drastically sexual. The British crew called it 'the Danish handshake'. Vinterberg suggested that he would have gone much further if it had been a Danish film.

Release
The film was released on 1 May 2015.

The first teaser trailer debuted on 23 November 2014. It features the song "Let No Man Steal Your Thyme" performed by Carey Mulligan and Michael Sheen. A teaser poster was also revealed to mark the 140th anniversary of the novel of the same name.

Reception

Box office
Far from the Madding Crowd grossed $12.2 million in North America and $17.9 million in other territories for a worldwide total of $30.2 million.

Critical response
Far from the Madding Crowd received positive reviews from critics. On Rotten Tomatoes, the film has a rating of 84%, based on 193 reviews, with an average rating of 7.3/10. The website's critical consensus reads, "Far from the Madding Crowd invites tough comparisons to Thomas Hardy's classic novel – and its previous adaptation – but stands on its own thanks to strong direction and a talented cast." Metacritic gave the film a score of 71 out of 100, based on 40 critics, indicating "generally favorable reviews".

Carey Mulligan's performance was critically praised and some considered it better than the 1967 adaptation starring Julie Christie. Rolling Stone's Peter Travers, in his three out of four star review, said "Vinterberg may rush the final act, but he brings out the wild side in Mulligan, who can hold a close-up like nobody's business. She's a live wire in a movie that knows how to stir up a classic for the here and now."

References

External links
 
 

2015 films
2010s historical romance films
2015 romantic drama films
British romantic drama films
Films based on works by Thomas Hardy
British historical romance films
Romantic period films
Films about farmers
Films set in England
Films set on farms
Films shot in Dorset
Films shot in Buckinghamshire
Films shot in London
Films shot in Oxfordshire
Films set in the 1870s
Films directed by Thomas Vinterberg
Films with screenplays by David Nicholls
Films scored by Craig Armstrong (composer)
DNA Films films
2010s English-language films
2010s British films